Radio Fun was a British celebrity comics comic paper that ran from (issues dates) 15 October 1938 to 18 February 1961, when it became the first out of twelve titles to merge with Buster.

The comic strips included the uncredited work of industry regulars such as Roy Wilson and George and Reg Parlett. The format of the humorous strips was to pack in as many gags and slapstick situations as possible.

Publication history 
Wonder merged with it in 1953.

The title became Radio Fun and Adventures towards the end of its run.

Radio Fun ran for 1167 issues.

Strips 
The comic mainly featured comic strip versions of radio and film stars, including:
 Arthur Askey
 Benny Hill
 Bernard Bresslaw
 Charlie Chester
 Petula Clark
 Charlie Drake
 Clark Gable
 Tommy Handley
 Jimmy Jewel and Ben Warriss
 Tom Keene
 Sandy Powell
 Jack Warner
 Norman Wisdom

In its last few years, it ran a Superman strip abridged and reformatted from DC Comics. Other later cover strips were The Falcon and Wagon Train.

References

Sources 
 
 

Fleetway and IPC Comics titles
British humour comics
1938 comics debuts
1961 comics endings
Comics magazines published in the United Kingdom
Comics based on radio series
Comics based on films
Comics based on real people